An electron acceptor is a chemical entity that accepts electrons transferred to it from another compound. It is an oxidizing agent that, by virtue of its accepting electrons, is itself reduced in the process. Electron acceptors are sometimes mistakenly called electron receptors. 

Typical oxidizing agents undergo permanent chemical alteration through covalent or ionic reaction chemistry, resulting in the complete and irreversible transfer of one or more electrons. In many chemical circumstances, however, the transfer of electronic charge from an electron donor may be only fractional, meaning an electron is not completely transferred, but results in an electron resonance between the donor and acceptor. This leads to the formation of charge transfer complexes in which the components largely retain their chemical identities.

The electron accepting power of an acceptor molecule is measured by its electron affinity which is the energy released when filling the lowest unoccupied molecular orbital (LUMO).

The energy required to remove one electron from the electron donor is its ionization energy (I). The energy liberated by attachment of an electron to the electron acceptor is the negative of its electron affinity (A). The overall system energy change (ΔE) for the charge transfer is then .

In chemistry, a class of electron acceptors that acquire not just one, but a set of two paired electrons that form a covalent bond with an electron donor molecule, is known as a Lewis acid. This phenomenon gives rise to the wide field of Lewis acid-base chemistry. The driving forces for electron donor and acceptor behavior in chemistry is based on the concepts of electropositivity (for donors) and electronegativity (for acceptors) of atomic or molecular entities.

Examples
Examples of electron acceptors include oxygen, nitrate, iron (III), manganese (IV), sulfate, carbon dioxide, or in some microorganisms the chlorinated solvents such as tetrachloroethylene (PCE), trichloroethylene (TCE), dichloroethene (DCE), and vinyl chloride (VC). These reactions are of interest not only because they allow organisms to obtain energy, but also because they are involved in the natural biodegradation of organic contaminants. When clean-up professionals use monitored natural attenuation to clean up contaminated sites, biodegradation is one of the major contributing processes.

In biology, a terminal electron acceptor  refers to either the last compound to receive an electron in an electron transport chain, such as oxygen during cellular respiration, or the last cofactor to receive an electron within the electron transfer domain of a reaction center during photosynthesis.  All organisms obtain energy by transferring electrons from an electron donor to an electron acceptor. During this process the electron acceptor is reduced and the electron donor is oxidized.

See also
Acceptor (semiconductors)
Redox reactions
Semiconductor

References

External links
Electron acceptor definition at United States Geological Survey website
Environmental Protection Agency

Electrochemical concepts